Carrownlisheen Wedge Tomb is a wedge-shaped gallery grave and National Monument located on Inishmaan, Ireland.

Location
Carrownlisheen Wedge Tomb is located in the eastern lowlands of Inishmaan.

History

Built c. 4000–2500 BC, this is a wedge-shaped gallery grave.

References

National Monuments in County Galway
Archaeological sites in County Galway
Megalithic monuments in Ireland
Aran Islands
Tombs in the Republic of Ireland